Ryan Edgar (born 1986) is a former footballer who played as a midfielder. Born in England, he represented Dominica at international level.

Early and personal life
Edgar was born in Newham.

Edgar is a cousin of England international footballer Jermain Defoe. In May 2009, Edgar was fined for driving Defoe's car without a full driving license.

Club career
Edgar was with Milton Keynes Dons and Farnborough Town before joining Canvey Island. In July 2008 he had a trial with Luton Town, but joined Histon at the start of the 2008–09 season. He moved on to Potters Bar Town where he left to join Enfield Town in December 2008.

He subsequently rejoined Canvey Island, from where he joined Aveley in September 2009.

International career
Edgar made his debut for the Dominican national side in February 2008, playing in the 1–1 draw against Barbados in the first match of CONCACAF qualification for the 2010 World Cup. He also played in the return tie the following month, which Barbados won 1–0. The two games remain Edgar's only international appearances to date.

References

1986 births
Living people
People with acquired Dominica citizenship
English people of Dominica descent
Dominica footballers
English footballers
Association football midfielders
Dominica international footballers
Isthmian League players
Milton Keynes Dons F.C. players
Farnborough F.C. players
Canvey Island F.C. players
Histon F.C. players
Enfield Town F.C. players
Aveley F.C. players
Brentwood Town F.C. players